Colombia competed at the 1976 Summer Olympics in Montreal, Quebec,  Canada. 35 competitors, 32 men and 3 women, took part in 30 events in 7 sports.

Athletics

Men's 5000 metres
 Tibaduiza Reyes
 Heat — 13:49.49 (→ did not advance)

Men's 10,000 metres
 Víctor Mora
 Heat — 30:26.57 (→ did not advance)
 Tibaduiza Reyes
 Heat — 29:28.17 (→ did not advance)

Men's 400 m hurdles 
 Jesus Villegas Candelo
 Heat — did not finish (→ did not advance)

Men's marathon
 Jairo Cubillog Rauirez — 2:29:04 (→ 48th place)
 Rafael Mora Zamora — did not finish (→ no ranking)

Men's 20 km walk
 Ernesto Alfaro Bermudez — 1:33:13 (→ 19th place)
 Rafael Vega Hernández — 1:37:27 (→ 31st place)

Boxing

Men's Flyweight (– 51 kg)
 Virgilio Palomo
 First Round — Bye
 Second Round — Lost to Toshinori Koga (JPN), 0:5

Cycling

Eleven cyclists represented Colombia in 1976.

Individual road race
 Álvaro Pachón — 4:49:01 (→ 22nd place)
 Luis Manrique — 4:49:01 (→ 23rd place)
 Miguel Samacá — did not finish (→ no ranking)
 Abelardo Ríos — did not finish (→ no ranking)

Team time trial
 Cristóbal Pérez
 Álvaro Pachón
 Luis Manrique
 Julio Rubiano

Sprint
 Julio Echevarry — 11th place

Individual pursuit
 José Jaime Galeano — 26th place

Team pursuit
 José Jaime Galeano
 Jorge Hernández
 Carlos Mesa
 Jhon Quiceno

Sailing

Shooting

Swimming

Weightlifting

See also
Sports in Colombia

References

External links
Official Olympic Reports

Nations at the 1976 Summer Olympics
1976 Summer Olympics
1976 in Colombian sport